The Residence Permit for Hong Kong, Macao, and Taiwan Residents is an identity document in the People's Republic of China. It is issued to de jure Chinese nationals who do not have household registration in mainland China and are permanent residents of Hong Kong, Macau, or Taiwanese nationals, have lived in mainland China for over half a year, and either have a stable job, a stable domicile or attend school continuously in mainland China. Applications for this card first opened on 1 September 2018.

Background
Until the introduction of the residence permit, residents of these places could only use their mainland travel permits as identity document in mainland China. Since the mainland travel permits have a different format from the resident identity card for mainland Chinese residents, this caused trouble in situations where only the resident identity card can be used. The residence permit is designed to be similar to the resident identity card to let its holders enjoy the same basic public services and convenience as mainland Chinese residents.

Contents
Residence permit has a citizen identification number in the same format as resident identity card. This is the first time that the Chinese government ever assigns a number to residents of these places. The address codes of Hong Kong, Macau and Taiwan for the identification number are 810000, 820000 and 830000 respectively. The contents on the permit are mostly the same as those on the resident identity card; the differences are that there are number of issuances and mainland travel permit number on the obverse side, and there is no ethnicity on the reverse side.

References

Government of Hong Kong
Government of Macau
Mainland Travel Permit
Travel Permit
Residency